Nemasoma is a genus of millipedes belonging to the family Nemasomatidae.

The species of this genus are found in Europe.

Species:
 Nemasoma leechi Chamberlin, 1951 
 Nemasoma pium Chamberlin, 1918

References

Julida
Millipede genera